La El Habibi Mosque, also known as Bou Dhebena Mosque is a small mosque in the Medina of Tunis.

Localization 
The mosque can be found in 14 Sidi Saber Street.

Etymology 
It got its name from Muhammad VI al-Habib, one of the beys of Tunis who ruled the Husainid dynasty from 1922 until his death.

History 
According to the commemorative plaque, El Habibi Mosque was built in 1926.

References 

Mosques in Tunis